Jean Louis Pollatschek (born 1 August 1943) is a Scottish former footballer and manager who played as a left back in the Scottish League for Queen's Park and Hamilton Academical. He was capped by Scotland at amateur level and after his retirement, he became a manager and coach. Pollatschek managed the Glasgow University team, which reached the second round of the 1975–76 Scottish Cup and later served as manager of Scotland Women. He also coached at Clydebank and former club Hamilton Academical.

Personal life 
Pollatschek attended Holyrood School in Glasgow. Between 1976 and 1990, Pollatschek lectured at the Scottish School of Physical Education. He took up a position at the International School of Geneva in 1990 and retired in 2008. As of 2016, Pollatschek was living in Switzerland.

Career statistics

Honours 
Scotland Amateurs
 FA Centenary Amateur International Tournament

References 

Scottish footballers
Scottish Football League players
Queen's Park F.C. players
Association football fullbacks
Scotland amateur international footballers
Footballers from Glasgow
1943 births
Hamilton Academical F.C. players
Living people
Women's national association football team managers
Scottish football managers
Hamilton Academical F.C. non-playing staff
Clydebank F.C. (1965) non-playing staff
Scottish expatriate sportspeople in Switzerland
People educated at Holyrood Secondary School
Scotland women's national football team managers
Association football coaches